The Swedish School of Sport and Health Sciences (GIH) in Stockholm is a Swedish institution offering higher education in the fields of teaching profession in Physical Education, Sports coaching and Preventive health. The school offers both programmes and courses. It was founded as the Royal Central Gymnastics Institute (GCI) in 1813 by Per Henrik Ling, which makes it the oldest university college in the world within the field of human movement sciences.

References

External links 
  
 The Swedish School of Sport and Health Sciences 

Swedish School of Sport and Health Sciences
University colleges in Sweden
Sports universities and colleges
Educational institutions established in 1813